National Route 190 is a national highway of Japan connecting Yamaguchi, Yamaguchi and San'yō-Onoda, Yamaguchi in Japan, with a total length of .

See also

References

190
Roads in Yamaguchi Prefecture